Matthew Bourke (born 9 September 1968) is a former Australian rules footballer who played with Hawthorn and Fitzroy in the Australian Football League (AFL).

Recruited from Xavier College, Bourke made his debut in round 10 of the 1989 VFL season, against the West Coast Eagles at Subiaco. It was his only appearance for Hawthorn, unable to get back into a side which went on to claim the premiership. He didn't feature at all in the 1990 season and was then selected by Fitzroy at pick three in the 1991 Pre-Season Draft. In 1991 he made two appearances with Fitztoy, in rounds two and three.

References

1968 births
Australian rules footballers from Victoria (Australia)
Hawthorn Football Club players
Fitzroy Football Club players
Old Xaverians Football Club players
Living people